Alexander Russell Elder (born 25 April 1941) is a former Northern Irish footballer, who played for Burnley and Stoke City as well as the Northern Ireland national team.

He was said to play a very mature game for someone with so little experience of top-class football. Although not quick on the turn, he timed his tackles well and invariably made good use of the ball.

Career

Burnley
Elder was the very last piece in Harry Potts Championship jigsaw, signing aged 17 in January 1959 for £5,000 from Irish League club Glentoran. He spent the remainder of the 1958–59 season in the Burnley reserves, remaining there when the 1959–60 season began. By the eighth game of that season he made his first team debut against Preston and the great Tom Finney. Despite a 1–0 defeat Elder played well enough to retain his place and played in all but one of the remaining games that season. The 1959–60 season brought Burnley its second, and to date last, league championship. After a tense run-in with Wolves and Spurs, the other main title contenders, Burnley clinched the championship at Maine Road with a 2–1 victory on 2 May 1960. Elder admitted that he was fortunate as a young player to come into a side that included so many great players – including Jimmy Adamson and Jimmy McIlroy. Elder played in Burnley's European Cup campaign the following season and then in the FA Cup Final Wembley side of 1962. He forged a formidable full back partnership with John Angus and the two were only separated when Elder broke an ankle in pre-season training in 1963. In July 1965, Elder succeeded Brian Miller as club captain. Elder was just 26 when in August 1967 Burnley accepted £50,000 from Stoke City after making 330 appearances for the "Clarets" scoring 17 goals. While he was reluctant to leave, he admitted that his face did not fit in with the new coach, former teammate Jimmy Adamson.
As a young Burnley player Elder was featured on the 'Look at Life' documentary series in the episode called 'The Ball at His Feet'.  The programme covered the activities of apprentice footballers.

Stoke City
Elder made an unfortunate start to his Stoke career as in pre-season training for 1967–68 it took him until the end of October to make his debut and failed to reach the heights he set at Turf Moor and is considered to be one of Tony Waddington's worst signings. He played 44 games in 1968–69 and over the next four seasons he made 27 appearances and was released by the club after playing exactly 100 matches.

International career
In April 1960 Elder made his international debut for Northern Ireland in a Home International Championship game in Wrexham against Wales. He won 34 caps while at Burnley and a further six after he transferred to Stoke. He also represented Northern Ireland at B, Under 23 and Schooboy level.

Career statistics

Club
Source:

International
Source:

Honours
 Burnley
 Football League First Division champions: 1959–60
 FA Cup runner-up: 1962

References

External links
 
 Burnley stats
 International record

1941 births
Living people
Sportspeople from Lisburn
Association football defenders
Association footballers from Northern Ireland
Northern Ireland international footballers
Burnley F.C. players
Glentoran F.C. players
Stoke City F.C. players
NIFL Premiership players
English Football League players
FA Cup Final players